Jacqueline Gauthier (7 October 1918 – 18 September 1982) was a French stage and film actress.

Selected filmography
 Louise (1939)
 At Your Command, Madame (1942)
 Frederica (1942)
 Shop Girls of Paris (1943)
 Dropped from Heaven (1946)
 Song of the Clouds (1946)
 The Murderer Is Not Guilty (1946)
 The Husbands of Leontine (1947)
 Forbidden to the Public (1949)
 Eve and the Serpent (1949)
 She and Me (1952)
 The Terror with Women (1956)

References

Bibliography
 Goble, Alan. The Complete Index to Literary Sources in Film. Walter de Gruyter, 1999.

External links

1918 births
1982 deaths
20th-century French actresses
French film actresses
Actresses from Paris
Burials at Batignolles Cemetery
1982 suicides
Suicides in France